Mandy is a BBC TV comedy series, written by and starring Diane Morgan as the title character Mandy Carter. After a pilot in 2019, the first series was broadcast starting in August 2020. A second series was commissioned by the BBC in 2021 which was released in January 2022.

Cast

Episodes

Pilot (2019)

Series 1 (2020)

Christmas special (2021)

Series 2 (2022)

References

External links 
 
 

2019 British television series debuts
2010s British comedy-drama television series
2020s British comedy-drama television series
BBC comedy-drama television shows
English-language television shows